The Java Access Bridge (JAB) exposes accessibility information about Java components to screen readers and other assistive technologies running on the Windows platform.

Prior to Java SE Version 7 Update 6, the Java Access Bridge needed to be installed separately, but is now distributed with the Java Runtime Environment.

References

External links 

Oracle's Java Access Bridge Installation and Application Developer's Guide

Java platform software
Java (programming language)